DPP v Camplin (1978)  was an English criminal law appeal to the House of Lords in 1978.  Its unanimous judgment helped to define the main limits of defence of provocation chiefly until Parliament replaced the defence with one of "loss of control" in the Coroners and Justice Act 2009.  Its ratio decidendi (main reasoning) continues to have precedent value as the new "loss of control" defence is a renaming to avoid creep of the term into scenarios for which it was never intended, above all a blurring with diminished responsibility.

Facts of the case 
The defendant at trial, Camplin, was 15 years old at the time of the offence.  He killed Mohammed Lal Khan by hitting him on the head with a chapati pan following Khan having sex with him non-consensually (then referred to as buggery) and then laughing at him.

Decision 
The jury weighed up the evidence and convicted Camplin of murder.  He appealed contending the judge was wrong to direct the jury that age was irrelevant as to his defence of provocation.  The appeal was allowed (confirming it could be relevant).

The issue at the heart of the Camplin case is whether the "reasonable man" test by numerous precedents laid out for the defence of provocation was one which matched the characteristics of the defendant or whether it ought to be confined to the characteristics of the "adult male".  Lord Diplock noted that the "reasonable man" was:

Lord Diplock noted that in the facts before the court, the age of the defendant was "a characteristic which may have its effects on temperament as well as physique".  The House of Lords agreed with a previous Court of Appeal judgment which found that it was wrong for the trial judge to have instructed the jury to not consider the defendant's age (or sex) when deciding whether he had been provoked.

Key citations of this case
 Applied in R v Graham [1982] 1 All ER 801
 Approving per curiam ratio that made relevant personal characteristics of sex and age.  The same was part of this case's ratio in its final appeal namely as to duress and the duty to act reasonably if under duress.

Footnotes and references 
Notes

References

English criminal case law
House of Lords cases
1978 in case law
1978 in British law